Those Scurvy Rascals is a children's animated series following the adventures of three underwear obsessed pirates. First aired by Nickelodeon UK in May 2005, it is now broadcast worldwide. The main characters Sissy Le Poop (called Jolly Roger in some versions), Smelly Pete and Shark Bait (plus Polly the Parrot) all live on the ship called "The Soiled Pair" and go on a different random adventure in every episode. The series was developed and produced by Blue-Zoo Productions and is owned by Entara.

The opening sequence features their ship and the names of the characters. The theme song is as follows:

 They sail upon the ocean from Jamaica to Penzance,

 but they don't want gold and they don't want treasure,

 they only want your pants!

 pants on the poop deck,

 pants in the hold,

 pants in the chest where there should be gold,

 pants in the crows nest,

 pants at sea,

 and a big pair of pants where the sail should be-

 those scurvy rascals!

Episodes
 Pilot: Pant Island (2005)
 Pants Odyssey (2005)
 Pet Pants (2005)
 Pantartica (2005)
 The Great Pantcreas Operation (2005)
 Scaredy Pants (2005)
 Under Water Pants (2006)
 Raiders of the Lost Pants (2006)
 Mail Pants (2006)
 Super Pants (2006)
 Dr Pete & Mr Hyde (2006)
 Robot Pants (2006)
 Mama Bait (2006)
 Fist Full of Pants (2006)
 Miner Pants (2006)
 Pirate Pant Pasty (2006)
 1001 Arabian Pants (2006)
 Sumo Pants (2006)
 Jurassic Pants (2006)
 Panties Are Forever (2006)
 Princess and the Pants (2006)
 Panties on Parade (2006)
 Gorilla Circus (2006)
 Pantium 3000 (2006)
 Lochness Pantster (2006)
 Pantcake Day's (2006)

Awards
British Academy Children's Awards nomination (2006) for Animation
British Animation Award (2006) for Best Children's Series
British Animation Award (2006) for Children's Choice Award

Credits
Daniel Isman: Executive Producer
Oli Hyatt: Producer & Director
Adam Shaw: Producer & Director 
Tom Box: Associate Producer
Nick Mercer: Voices
Tamborine: Sound
Bill Ledger: Character Design
Ben Lee-Delisle: Music
Simon A. Brown: Writer
Andrew Dawson: Writer
Steve Dawson: Writer
Peter Devonald: Writer
Tim Inman: Writer
Ian Powell : Writer
Dan Wicksman: Writer

External links
 Official website
 Blue-Zoo Productions: Creators of Those Scurvy Rascals
 Entara: Owners of Those Scurvy Rascals

British children's animated comedy television series
British computer-animated television series
2005 British television series debuts